Ratarda melanoxantha is a moth in the family Cossidae. It is found on Borneo.

Adults have mottled yellow wings with a basal black area on the forewings. This black area occupies half of the wing on the hindwings.

References

Natural History Museum Lepidoptera generic names catalog

Ratardinae